The 2008 Los Angeles County Board of Supervisors elections were held on June 3, 2008, coinciding with the California elections, June 2008. Three of the five seats (for the Second, Fourth and Fifth Districts) of the Los Angeles County Board of Supervisors were contested in this election. None of the incumbents were termed out.

Results

Second District 
 

  

Since Second District voters failed to elect a Supervisor by a two-thirds vote, a runoff election was held on November 4, 2008, coinciding with the 2008 United States presidential election.

Fourth District

Fifth District

References

External links 
Los Angeles County Department of Registrar-Recorder/County Clerk

Los Angeles County Board of Supervisors
Los Angeles County Board of Supervisors elections
Los Angeles County